iXMicro, Inc., a privately held company, was a graphics chipset and video card manufacturer. The company was founded as Integrated Micro Solutions (IMS) in 1994 and ceased operations in 2000. The American actor Christopher Knight served as vice president of graphics marketing for iXMicro.

Products

Video cards
 The Twin Turbo-128 PCI series, including the 128S and 128P2, came standard on the Power Macintosh 9600 and was a high-performance upgrade for the Power Macintosh 8600.
 The TwinTurbo 128M8, a PCI video card, came with the Motorola StarMax 5000/300. This video card was also used in the Umax Pulsar 2500 (SuperMac S900/250).
 The ix3D Dual Monitor was a dual-monitor video card for Mac and clones.
 The ix3D Game Rocket was a 3D accelerator based on the 3dfx Voodoo Banshee chipset.
 The ix3D Road Rocket was a 2D and 3D CardBus video accelerator for the Apple Macintosh PowerBook G3 series, with 4 MB SGRAM and support for an extended desktop at 1280×1040.
 The ix3D Pro Rez was a 128-bit 2D and 3D graphics accelerator with 8 MB of SGRAM. It supports resolutions up to 1600×1200 and refresh rates as high as 100 Hz.
 The TwinTurbo 128P8 was a PCI video card for the PC x86 market with standard 15-pin VGA connector.

Video capture
 iXMicro also offered ixTV or Turbo TV video capture devices.

ATM cards
 The Lightning II ATM 155/25 PCI cards

See also
 Macintosh clone

References

External links
 

American companies established in 1994
American companies disestablished in 2000
Computer companies established in 1994
Computer companies disestablished in 2000
Defunct computer companies of the United States
Graphics hardware companies
Manufacturing companies based in San Jose, California